Lavan is both a surname and a given name. Notable people with the name include:

Surname:
 Al Lavan (born 1946), former college football head coach
 Doc Lavan (1890–1952), Major League Baseball shortstop
 John Lavan (1911–2006), former judge on the Supreme Court of Western Australia
 Rene Lavan (born 1968), Cuban-American actor
 Samuel Lavan (born 1982), Israeli footballer

Given name:
 LaVan Davis (born 1966), American actor and singer
 Harvey Lavan "Van" Cliburn Jr. (1934-2013), American pianist

Fictional characters:
 Lavan Firestorm, character in the book Brightly Burning